Shamsul Anuar bin Nasarah (Jawi: شمس الأنوار بن نصرة; born 1 June 1967) is a Malaysian politician who has served as the Deputy Minister of Home Affairs in the Pakatan Harapan (PH) administration under Prime Minister Anwar Ibrahim and Minister Saifuddin Nasution Ismail since December 2022 and the Member of Parliament (MP) for Lenggong since March 2008. He served as the Minister of Energy and Natural Resources in the Perikatan Nasional (PN) administration under former Prime Minister Muhyiddin Yassin from March 2020 to his resignation in August 2021. He is a member of the United Malays National Organisation (UMNO) party in the Barisan Nasional (BN) coalition. He has also served as President of the Malaysian Youth Council. His appointment as a deputy minister in December 2022 is a demotion as he was previously appointed as a minister in March 2020. This has rarely happened in the Malaysian politics.

Election results

Honours

Honours of Malaysia
  :
  Medallist of the Order of the Defender of the Realm (PPN) (2004)
  :
  Knight Commander of the Order of the Perak State Crown (DPMP) – Dato' (2007)
  :
  Grand Commander of the Order of the Territorial Crown (SMW) – Datuk Seri (2021)
  :
  Knight Commander of the Order of the Life of the Crown of Kelantan (DJMK) – Dato' (2022)

See also
Lenggong (federal constituency)

References

Living people
1966 births
People from Perak
Medallists of the Order of the Defender of the Realm
Malaysian people of Malay descent
Malaysian Muslims
United Malays National Organisation politicians
Members of the Dewan Rakyat
University of Malaya alumni
21st-century Malaysian politicians